Gaddi is both a surname and a given name.

Gaddi surname 
 Gaddo Gaddi (c. 1239 – c. 1312), Florentine mosaicist and painter
 Taddeo Gaddi (c. 1290 – 1366), Florentine painter
 Agnolo Gaddi  (c. 1350 – 1396), Florentine painter
 Giovanni Gaddi (painter) (fl. 1333 - 1383), Florentine painter
 Jacopo Gaddi  (c. 1600 - after 1658), Florentine poet
Giovanni Gaddi, owner of the Hellenistic Greek marble Gaddi Torso
 Clemente Gaddi (1901–1993), an Italian Roman Catholic prelate
 Mohammad Lalbabu Raut Gaddi, first and current Chief Minister of Province No. 2 of Federal Democratic Republic of Nepal.

Familial relationships 
Among the notable people, Gaddo Gaddi was the father of Taddeo Gaddi.  Taddeo was the father of Agnola Gaddi and Giovanni Gaddi, both notable painters listed here.

Gaddi given name 
 Gaddi Vasquez (born 1955), director of the United States Peace Corps, 2002–06, U.S. Ambassador to the United Nations Agencies for Food and Agriculture, 2006–09

References